The Kroumirie (also spelled Khroumirie) is a mountainous region located in northwestern Tunisia and northeastern Algeria. The region is named after its people, the Khumayr (locally Khmīr).

The Kroumirie is a western extension of the Atlas Mountains. It has extensive forest cover, over 70% of the trees being cork oak and 20% zean oak. Other species include wild olive and the undergrowth comprises mostly ferns. Owing to a relatively high rainfall it is the most well watered regions in Tunisia ( a year). Snowfall is common at higher elevations.

In the Roman period, the Kroumirie was crossed by three important roads: that from Carthage to Hippo Regius and those from Simitthu and Vaga to Thabraca (Tabarka). The latter was the port from which the products of the mountains—lumber, wild animals, oil, wheat and minerals—were exported. The Kroumirie is completely unmentioned in written sources from the Middle Ages. The Khumayr had friendly commercial relations with the Genoese of Tabarka after 1540. Only in more modern times did it earn a reputation as a place of resistance against the forces of governments both Tunisian and foreign.

Notes

References

External links 
 Ain Kroumir - Regional Website of the Kroumirie

Regions of Tunisia
Geography of Tunisia
Atlas Mountains
Mountain ranges of Tunisia
Mountain ranges of Algeria